This is a list of governors of the Spanish Mariana Islands. The Mariana Islands belonged to the Captaincy General of the Philippines, but had his own governors.

Establishment of permanent Spanish presence

Jesuit mission superiors 
 Diego Luis de San Vitores: 16 Jun 1668 –  2 Apr 1672     
  Francisco Solano: 2 Apr 1672 – 13 Jun 1672
 Francisco Ezquerra: 13 Jun 1672 –  2 Feb 1674
 Pierre Coomans: 2 Feb 1674 – 16 Jun 1674

Garrison commanders  
 Juan de Santa Cruz: 16 Jun 1668 –  2 May 1672
 Juan de Santiago: 2 May 1672 – 16 Jun 1674
 Damián de Esplana: 16 Jun 1674 – 10 Jun 1676

Governors of the Mariana Islands 
 Francisco de Irisarri y Vivar: 10 Jun 1676 – 21 Jun 1678
 Juan Antonio de Salas: 21 Jun 1678 –  5 Jun 1680
 José de Quiroga y Losada (1st time (acting): 5 Jun 1680 – 15 Jun 1681
 Antonio de Saravia: 15 Jun 1681 –  3 Nov 1683
 Damián de Esplana (1st time, after military command): 3 Nov 1683 – Feb 1686
 José de Quiroga y Losada (2nd time): Feb 1686 – Sep 1689
 Damián de Esplana (2nd time): Sep 1689 – 16 Aug 1694
 José de Quiroga y Losada (3rd time): 16 Aug 1694 – 26 Jul 1696
 José Madrazo (interim): 26 Jul 1696 – 15 Sep 1700
 Francisco Medrano y Asiain (interim): 15 Sep 1700 –  1 Sep 1704
 Antonio Villamor y Vadillo (interim): 1 Sep 1704 – 1706
 Manuel Argüelles y Valdés (1st time; acting): 1706 –  1 Sep 1709
 Juan Antonio Pimentel: 1 Sep 1709 – 21 Nov 1720
 Luis Antonio Sánchez de Tagle: 21 Nov 1720 –  4 Apr 1725
 Juan de Ojeda (acting): 4 Apr 1725 – 28 Sep 1725
 Manuel Argüelles y Valdés (2nd time): 28 Sep 1725 – 12 Feb 1730
 Pedro Lasso de la Vega: 12 Feb 1730 –  1 Nov 1730
 Diego Félix de Balboa (interim): 1 Nov 1730 – 25 Aug 1734
 Francisco Cárdenas Pacheco: 25 Aug 1734 –  2 Apr 1740
 Miguel Fernández de Cárdenas: 2 Apr 1740 – 21 Sep 1746
 Domingo Gómez de la Sierra: 21 Sep 1746 –  8 Sep 1749
 Enrique de Olavide y Michelena (1st time): 8 Sep 1749 –  6 Nov 1756 
 Andrés del Barrio y Rábago: 6 Nov 1756 – 20 Nov 1759
 José de Soroa: 20 Nov 1759 –  9 Jun 1768
 Enrique de Olavide y Michelena (2nd time): 9 Jun 1768 – 15 Sep 1771
 Mariano Tobías: 15 Sep 1771 – 15 Jun 1774
 Antonio Apodaca (interim): 15 Jun 1774 –  6 Jun 1776
 Felipe de Ceraín: 6 Jun 1776 – 21 Aug 1786
 José Arleguí y Leóz: 21 Aug 1786 –  2 Sep 1794
 Manuel Muro: 2 Sep 1794 – 12 Jan 1802
 Vicente Blanco: 12 Jan 1802 – 18 Oct 1806
 Alejandro Parreño: 18 Oct 1806 – 26 Jul 1812
 José de Medinilla y Pineda  (1st time): 26 Jul 1812 – 15 Aug 1822
 José Montilla (interim): 15 Aug 1822 – 15 May 1823
 José Ganga Herrero: 15 May 1823 –  1 Aug 1826
 José de Medinilla y Pineda (2nd time):  1 Aug 1826 – 26 Sep 1831
 Francisco Ramón de Villalobos: 26 Sep 1831 –  1 Oct 1837
 José Casillas Salazar: 1 Oct 1837 –  1 Oct 1843
 Gregorio Santa Maria:  1 Oct 1843 –  4 Apr 1848
 Félix Calvo y Noriega (acting): 7 Apr 1848 –  8 Sep 1848
 Pablo Pérez: 8 Sep 1848 – 16 May 1855
 Felipe María de la Corte y Ruano Calderón:  16 May 1855 – 28 Jan 1866
 Francisco Moscoso y Lara: 28 Jan 1866 – 17 Aug 1871
 Luis de Ibáñez y García : 17 Aug 1871 – 24 Mar 1873
 Eduardo Beaumont y Calafat:  24 Mar 1873 – 14 Jan 1875
Manuel Bravo y Barrera: 14 Jan 1875 – 15 Aug 1880
 Francisco Brochero y Parreño: 15 Aug 1880 – 18 Mar 1884
 Ángel de Pazos y Vela Hidalgo: 18 Mar 1884 –  3 Aug 1884
 Antonio Borredá y Alares (acting): 3 Aug 1884 –  1 Nov 1884
 Francisco Olive y García: 1 Nov 1884 – 22 Jul 1885
 Enrique Solano Llanderal: 22 Jul 1885 – 21 Apr 1890

 Joaquín Vara de Rey y Rubio: 21 Apr 1890 – 14 Aug 1891
Luis Santos Fontordera: 14 Aug 1891 – 23 Aug 1892
 Vicente Gómez Hernández: 23 Aug 1892 –  1 Sep 1893
 Juan Godoy del Castillo (acting): 1 Sep 1893 – 31 Oct 1893
 Emilio Galisteo y Brunenque: 31 Oct 1893 – 24 Dec 1895
 Jacobo Marina: 24 Dec 1895 – 15 Feb 1897
 Ángel Nieto y de Molina de Esquinas (acting): 15 Feb 1897 – 17 Apr 1897
 Juan Marina y Vega: 17 Apr 1897 – 21 Jun 1898

See also 
 List of governors of the Northern Mariana Islands
 List of governors of Guam
 List of colonial governors of Papua New Guinea#New Guinea
 Governor of the South Seas Mandate
 High Commissioner of the Trust Territory of the Pacific Islands

References 

Mariana Islands
Mariana Islands